Akhmetovo (Äxmät) is a rural locality (a selo) in Chekmagushevsky District, Bashkortostan, Russia. The population was 326 as of 2010. There are 3 streets.

Geography 
Akhmetovo is located 29 km northwest of Chekmagush (the district's administrative centre) by road. Dyumeyevo is the nearest rural locality.

References 

Rural localities in Chekmagushevsky District